The Playboy of the Western World is a three-act play written by Irish playwright John Millington Synge and first performed at the Abbey Theatre, Dublin, on 26 January 1907. It is set in Michael James Flaherty's public house in County Mayo (on the west coast of Ireland) during the early 1900s. It tells the story of Christy Mahon, a young man running away from his farm, claiming he killed his father.

The play is known for its use of the poetic, evocative language of Hiberno-English, heavily influenced by the Irish language, as Synge celebrates the lyrical speech of the Irish.

Characters

  Christy Mahon, a man who brags he has killed his father
  Old Mahon, Christy's father, a squatter
  Michael James Flaherty, a publican
  Margaret Flaherty, called Pegeen Mike, Michael's daughter and the barmaid
  Shawn Keogh, a young man who loves Pegeen
  Widow Quin, a widow of about thirty 
  Philly Cullen and Jimmy Farrell, farmers
  Sara Tansey, Susan Brady, Honor Blake, and Nelly, village girls
  A Bellman
  Some peasants and farmers'Synopsis
On the west coast of County Mayo Christy Mahon stumbles into Flaherty's tavern. There he claims that he is on the run because he killed his own father by driving a loy into his head. Flaherty praises Christy for his boldness, and Flaherty's daughter (and the barmaid), Pegeen, falls in love with Christy, to the dismay of her betrothed, Shawn Keogh. Because of the novelty of Christy's exploits and the skill with which he tells his own story, he becomes something of a town hero. Many other women also become attracted to him, including the Widow Quin, who tries unsuccessfully to seduce Christy at Shawn's behest. Christy also impresses the village women by his victory in a donkey race, using the slowest beast.

Eventually Christy's father, Mahon, who was only wounded, tracks him to the tavern. When the townsfolk realize that Christy's father is alive, everyone, including Pegeen, shuns him as a liar and a coward. To regain Pegeen's love and the respect of the town, Christy attacks his father a second time. This time it seems that Old Mahon really is dead, but instead of praising Christy, the townspeople, led by Pegeen, bind and prepare to hang him to avoid being implicated as accessories to his crime. Christy's life is saved when his father, beaten and bloodied, crawls back onto the scene, having improbably survived his son's second attack. As Christy and his father leave to wander the world, having reconciled, Shawn suggests that he and Pegeen get married soon, but she spurns him. Pegeen laments betraying and losing Christy: "I've lost the only playboy of the western world."

Riots

Riots occurred in January 1907 during and following the opening performance of the play. The riots were stirred up by Irish nationalists and republicans who viewed the contents of the play as an offence to public morals and an insult against Ireland. The riots took place in Dublin, spreading out from the Abbey Theatre and finally being quelled by the actions of the Dublin Metropolitan Police.

The fact that the play was based on a story of apparent patricide also attracted a hostile public reaction. It was egged on by nationalists, including Sinn Féin leader Arthur Griffith, who believed that the theatre was not sufficiently political and described the play as "a vile and inhuman story told in the foulest language we have ever listened to from a public platform". With the pretext of a perceived slight on the virtue of Irish womanhood in the line "a drift of chosen females standing in their shifts, maybe" (a shift being a female undergarment, similar to a nightgown), a significant portion of the crowd rioted, causing the remainder of the play to be acted out in dumb show. Nevertheless, press opinion soon turned against the rioters and the protests petered out.

Years later, William Butler Yeats declared to rioters against Seán O'Casey's pacifist drama The Plough and the Stars, in reference to the "Playboy Riots": "You have disgraced yourself again. Is this to be the recurring celebration of the arrival of Irish genius?"

The production of Synge's play met with more disturbances in the United States in 1911. On opening night in New York, hecklers booed, hissed, and threw vegetables and stink bombs while men scuffled in the aisles. The company was later arrested in Philadelphia and charged with putting on an immoral performance. The charges were later dismissed.

Performances
The play was staged by the Edinburgh Gateway Company in March 1957, with Norman Fraser playing Christy and George Davies playing his father.The Edinburgh Gateway Company (1965), The Twelve Seasons of the Edinburgh Gateway Company, 1953 - 1965, The St. Giles Press, Edinburgh, p. 47

In September 2007, the play returned to the Abbey in a modern adaptation by Bisi Adigun and Roddy Doyle. Set in a suburb of West Dublin, it tells the story of Christopher Malomo, a Nigerian refugee who claims to have killed his father with a pestle. In 2011, The Old Vic, in London, played host to a classic adaptation directed by John Crowley starring Robert Sheehan, Niamh Cusack and Ruth Negga.

Adaptations
Theatrical
In 1912, Sil-Vara and Charles H. Fisher translated it into German as Der Held (literally 'hero') des Westerlands or Der Held der westlichen Welt and had it published by Georg Müller and performed at Max Reinhardt's Kammerspiele, Berlin, at the Neue Wiener Bühne in Vienna and at the Stadttheater in Münster. In 1973 the Irish language national theatre group Taibhdhearc na Gaillimhe produced an adaptation in the Irish language by Seán Ó Carra entitled Buachaill Báire an Domhain Thiar.Buachaill Baire an Domhain Thiar at doollee.com The play was adapted in 1984 by Trinidadian playwright Mustapha Matura, lifted out of turn of the century Ireland and set down in 1950s Trinidad, and retitled Playboy of the West Indies. In 2006, a Mandarin Chinese version of the play set in a hairdressers shop in a Beijing suburb was performed at the Beijing Oriental Theatre. It was produced by the Irish contemporary theatre company, Pan Pan. The play attracted controversy when a member of the audience complained about the shortness of the skirt worn by Sha Sha, playing the Sarah Tansey character. Following the complaint, the play was attended by two policemen.

Operatic and musical
In 1975 Giselher Klebe's operatic adaption Ein wahrer Held (A True Hero) premiered at the Zurich Opera House.
A 2003 operatic rendition by Mark Alburger was produced from 23 to 26 August 2007 by Goat Hall Productions/SF Cabaret Opera at Oakland Metro Opera House, in Oakland, California. A musical theatre version, written by Kate Hancock and Richard B. Evans, premiered at the STAGES 2005 musical festival at the Theatre Building Chicago. In 2009, a musical adaptation entitled Golden Boy of the Blue Ridge premiered in New York City.  With music by Peter Mills and a book by Peter Mills and Cara Reichel, the musical transplants the story to 1930s Appalachia and is set to a bluegrass-flavoured score.

Film and television
A 1962 film version of the play was produced in Ireland, with the screenplay by writer-director Brian Desmond Hurst. It stars Siobhán McKenna as Pegeen, Gary Raymond as Christy, and Elspeth March as Widow Quin, with music by Seán Ó Riada. 

London weekday ITV contractor Associated-Rediffusion made a production of the play for schools, in three parts plus an introduction to the history of the period, which aired in February and March 1964.

A 1994 TV movie adaptation was entitled Paris or Somewhere. Set in rural Saskatchewan, it starred Callum Keith Rennie as Christy Mahon, a young American farmer who arrives in town and claims to have killed his father. He charms the town with his story, particularly Peg (Molly Parker), the daughter of a local store owner and bootlegger. The screenplay was written by novelist Lee Gowan. A film adaptation was also made in 2016. Set in the USA and titled, ' My Father Die', it was written and directed by Sean Brosnan.

In June 2018, a new feature-length film production entitled Christy Mahon - Playboy of the Western World was registered by Swiss producers on IMDB. Filming will be in Bray, Ireland and scheduled for late October / November 2019. The producers procured a print of the play from a notebook version of the text published in 1912 and upon which they based their screenplay.

Reputed inspiration

While based in a fictional shebeen (unlicensed pub) in the Geesala area of County Mayo, some of the characters and events in the play are partially based on a true story which was reputedly recounted to Synge by an old man from the Aran Islands. According to Synge, the character of Christy Mahon, the "savage hero" of the play, was at least partially based on a convicted criminal who assaulted a woman on Achill Island in the late 19th century.

This man, James Lynchehaun (c.1864-1937) from Tonregee townland on the Corraun peninsula, brutally assaulted his English employer, Mrs Agnes MacDonnell, at her home on Achill Island on 6 October 1894. He reportedly "burned [her] from ankle to knee, fractured her skull with a stone, knocked out one eye, bit her nose off and kicked thorns from a whin bush deep into her vagina" after burning down her home, Valley House, on an 800 hectare property. He was arrested, convicted, sentenced to lifetime penal servitude, escaped, sheltered by locals from the police for a while, recaptured (after a £300 bounty for his recapture was placed), imprisoned for seven years before escaping again, making his way to the United States. He became something of a folk-hero in the US, falsely claiming his actions had been political and carried out on behalf of the Irish Republican Brotherhood, until Irish nationalist Michael Davitt publicly referred to him as a "murderer" and refused to shake his hand, as did Douglas Hyde. (Davitt may have been under the mistaken impression that Mrs MacDonnell had died. She survived, albeit disfigured and forced to wear a veil when out in public, dying in 1923 after rebuilding Valley House.)

Efforts by the British authorities to have Lynchehaun extradited were rebuffed by American politicians and courts including the United States Supreme Court. President Teddy Roosevelt was then recruited [by Lynchehaun's supporters] to prevent his deportation. In a landmark court case in Indianapolis, where Lynchehaun had settled, Charles W. Moores, US Commissioner, "ruled that Lynchehaun's crime in Achill was a political one and the prisoner could, therefore, not be extradited. 'Let the prisoner be discharged', he ordered". Vice-president Charles W. Fairbanks visited Lynchehaun to tell him the news. Lynchehaun later visited Ireland twice, being deported the second time. He ultimately left his family in Indianapolis to wind up living in Glasgow. He died in Girvan, Scotland in 1937.

Quotations
Source:

 "... it's great luck and company I've won me in the end of time—two fine women fighting for the likes of me—till I'm thinking this night wasn't I a foolish fellow not to kill my father in the years gone by." —Christy
 "Drink a health to the wonders of the western world, the pirates, preachers, poteen-makers, with the jobbing jockies; parching peelers, and the juries fill their stomachs selling judgments of the English law." —Sara Tansey
 "Pegeen Mike, your gowl is on a cheerio ting still" -Christy (upon the penultimate relationship ending moment)
 "It's well you know what call I have. It's well you know it's a lonesome thing to be passing small towns with the lights shining sideways when the night is down, or going in strange places with a dog noising before you and a dog noising behind, or drawn to the cities where you'd hear a voice kissing and talking deep love in every shadow of the ditch, and you passing on with an empty, hungry stomach failing from your heart." —Christy
 "A daring fellow is the jewel of the world...." —Michael Flaherty
 "...the blow of a loy, have taught me that there's a great gap between a gallous story and a dirty deed." —Pegeen Mike
 "You've turned me a likely gaffer in the end of all, the way I'll go romancing through a romping lifetime, from this hour to the dawning of the Judgment Day." —Christy
 "Oh my grief, I've lost him surely. I've lost the only Playboy of the Western World." —Pegeen Mike

Notes

References
 Synge, J.M. (1997). The Playboy of the Western World, Introduction by Margaret Llewellyn Jones, Nick Hern Books, London, .
 Synge, J.M. (1983). The Playboy of the Western World. Commentary and notes by Non Worrall. London. .
 Kiely, David M. (1995). John Millington Synge: A Biography, New York, 
 
 Playboy of the Western World: Cummings Study Guides
 Denis Johnston, John Millington Synge'', (Columbia Essays on Modern Writing No. 12), (Columbia University Press, New York, 1965) pp. 29-39.

External links
 
 
www.briandesmondhurst.org- official legacy website of the director with filmography including The Playboy of the Westen World

Short film on Brian Desmond Hurst's Playboy of the Western World featuring part of the soundtrack

1907 plays
1907 in Ireland
1907 riots
Riots and civil disorder in Ireland
Art works that caused riots
Theatre controversies
Plays by John Millington Synge
Irish plays adapted into films
Plays adapted into operas